The Malaysian Dunlop Masters was a golf tournament in Malaysia in the 1970s and 1980s. Taiwanese golfer Chen Tze-ming won the 1978 event by a record 15 strokes. Despite his record-breaking win runner-up Simon Owen took the first prize money as Chen was still an amateur.

Winners
This list may be incomplete

See also
Malaysian Masters
Volvo Masters of Malaysia

References

Golf tournaments in Malaysia